Fritz Klein (1888–1945) was a German Nazi physician convicted and executed in 1945 following Nuremberg "Doctors Trial."

Fritz Klein may also refer to:

Fritz Klein (sex researcher) (1932–2006), Austrian physician and bisexual activist who resided in the US
Fritz Heinrich Klein (1892–1977), Austrian composer and pupil of Alban Berg
Fritz Klein (actor) (born 1948), American actor known for portraying Abraham Lincoln
Fritz Klein (historian) (1924–2011), German historian and left-wing Social Democrat